The fierce roundleaf bat (Hipposideros dinops) is a species of bat in the family Hipposideridae. It is found in Indonesia, Papua New Guinea, and the Solomon Islands.

Sources

Hipposideros
Bats of Oceania
Mammals of Papua New Guinea
Mammals of the Solomon Islands
Mammals described in 1905
Taxa named by Knud Andersen
Taxonomy articles created by Polbot